Anambra North Senatorial District in Anambra State covers seven local government areas which include Onitsha North, Onitsha South,  Oyi, Ogbaru, Anambra East, Anambra West and Ayamelum. There are 1,392 Polling Units (Pus)  and 99 Registration Areas (RAs). Onitsha North LGA INEC Office is the collation centre. A president of the 4th Senate between 1999 and 2000, Chuba Okadigbo is from this district. Stella  Oduah of the people’s Democratic Party is the current representative of Anambra North Senatorial District.

Notable people from Anambra North Senatorial District 
Stella Oduah

Chuba Okadigbo

Willie Obiano

Lynda Ikpeazu

Alfred Achebe

Tony Nwoye

Umu Obiligbo

Valarian Maduka Okeke

Emmanuel Obimma

Osita Osadebe

Notable places in Anambra North Senatorial District 
Ogbunike Cave

Chukwuemeka Odumegwu Ojukwu University, Igbariam

General Hospital Onitsha

Main Market Onitsha

River Niger

Omambala River

Basilica of the Most Holy Trinity, Onitsha

All Saints Cathedral, Onitsha

Dennis Memorial Grammar School, Onitsha

Christ The King College, Onitsha

Queen Rosary College, Onitsha

Queens Rosary Hospital, Onitsha

Climate change in Anambra North Senatorial District 
Anambra North Senatorial District has been known to be facing climate changes. In 2012, local government areas like Anambra East, Anambra West, Ayamelum and Ogbaru were affected with heavy flooding that caused loss of life, property, farm land and crops.  The flood was estimated to have displaced about 2 million people, including men and women and children.

List of senators representing Anambra North

References 

Politics of Anambra State
Senatorial districts in Nigeria